Coraline is an opera in two acts by English composer Mark-Anthony Turnage, with a libretto by Rory Mullarkey. It is based on the 2002 dark fantasy children's novella by Neil Gaiman. 

The opera had its world premiere at the Barbican Centre in London from 27 March to 7 April 2018, presented by the Barbican and produced by the Royal Opera House in a co-production with Folkoperan, Opéra de Lille, Theater Freiburg and Victorian Opera. The premiere was directed by Aletta Collins and conducted by Sian Edwards.

Roles

References

2018 operas
Operas by Mark-Anthony Turnage
English-language operas
Operas
Operas based on novels
Adaptations of works by Neil Gaiman